James Angus may refer to

 James Angus (artist) (born 1970), Australian sculptor
 James Angus (scientist) (born 1949), Australian pharmacologist
 James Stout Angus (1830–1923), Shetland writer